This is a list of estimates of the real gross domestic product growth rate (not rebased GDP) in African states for the latest years recorded in the CIA World Factbook. Only fully recognised sovereign states with United Nations membership are included on this list.

List

See also
 Economic growth
 Gross domestic product
 List of countries by real GDP growth rate

References

GDP
GDP
Africa